Mary Lou McMaster is an American oncologist and clinical trialist who researches familial cancer genetics. She is a senior clinical trial specialist at the National Cancer Institute and a captain in the United States Public Health Service Commissioned Corps.

Life 
McMaster received her M.D. from the Wake Forest School of Medicine. She completed residency training in internal medicine and a fellowship in medical oncology at Vanderbilt University. Following a postdoctoral fellowship in cellular biology at the UNC Lineberger Comprehensive Cancer Center, she came to the National Institutes of Health (NIH), where she completed training in clinical medical genetics.

McMaster joined the National Cancer Institute (NCI) as a clinical research fellow in the then-genetic epidemiology branch in the division of cancer epidemiology and genetics. She researched cancer genetics with an emphasis on familial cancer syndromes. McMaster was promoted to staff clinician in 2002, and transferred to the clinical genetics branch (CGB) in 2016. She is a commissioned officer in the United States Public Health Service Commissioned Corps and was promoted to captain in 2012. McMaster is a senior clinical trial specialist. She researches Waldenström macroglobulinemia, lymphoproliferative disorders, testicular cancer, and DICER1 syndrome. McMaster presents at International Waldenstrom's Macroglobulinemia Foundation meetings.

See also 

 List of Wake Forest University people

References

External links 

 

Living people
Year of birth missing (living people)
Place of birth missing (living people)
Wake Forest School of Medicine alumni
National Institutes of Health people
American oncologists
Women oncologists
21st-century American women physicians
21st-century American physicians
Cancer researchers
Physician-scientists
Women medical researchers
American medical researchers
United States Public Health Service Commissioned Corps officers